Asencio is a Spanish surname. Notable people with this name include:

Asencio, or Henry Asencio (born 1972), American painter
Diego C. Asencio (1931–2020), American diplomat
Fabrice Asencio (1966–2016), French footballer
Jairo Asencio (born 1983), Dominican baseball pitcher
Miguel Asencio (born 1980), Dominican former baseball pitcher
Nicolás Asencio (born 1975), Ecuadorian footballer
Vicente Asencio (1908–1979), Spanish composer

See also
Asencio River, a river in Chile

Spanish-language surnames